Mikel Amantegui Errandonea (born 3 May 1979 in Irun, Basque Country) is a Spanish retired footballer who played as a left-back.

External links

1979 births
Living people
Sportspeople from Irun
Spanish footballers
Footballers from the Basque Country (autonomous community)
Association football defenders
Segunda División players
Segunda División B players
Tercera División players
Real Sociedad B footballers
Cultural Leonesa footballers
CE Sabadell FC footballers
CF Badalona players
Orihuela CF players
Girona FC players
Albacete Balompié players
Benidorm CF footballers